Mathildana is a genus of concealer moths in the family Oecophoridae. There are at least three described species in Mathildana.

Species
These three species belong to the genus Mathildana:
 Mathildana filpria Hodges, 1974 c g
 Mathildana flipria (Hodges, 1974) b
 Mathildana newmanella Clemens, 1864 c g b (Newman's mathildana moth)
Data sources: i = ITIS, c = Catalogue of Life, g = GBIF, b = Bugguide.net

References

Further reading

External links

 

Oecophorinae